Bruce Knowles (born 22 May 1957) is a Bahamian former swimmer. He competed in the men's 100 metre breaststroke at the 1976 Summer Olympics.

References

External links
 

1957 births
Living people
Bahamian male swimmers
Olympic swimmers of the Bahamas
Swimmers at the 1976 Summer Olympics
Place of birth missing (living people)
Male breaststroke swimmers